Chen Jian (born June 1961) is a former Chinese politician. He was investigated by China's top anti-graft agency in April 2022. Previously he served as a counsellor of Yunnan Provincial People's Government and before that, party secretary of Dali.

Biography
Chen was born in Kunming, Yunnan, in June 1961. He worked in Kunming Survey and Design Institute between August 1982 and October 1997. He joined the Chinese Communist Party (CCP) in June 1988. Beginning in October 1997, he served in several posts in Yunnan Development Investment Co., Ltd., including deputy manager, manager, and manager of investment department. In November 2001, he was assigned to the Yunnan Provincial Water Resources Department, where he eventually became its head. In January 2017, he was appointed party secretary of Dali Bai Autonomous Prefecture, and held that office until April 2021. He became a counsellor of Yunnan Provincial People's Government in April 2021, and served until April 2022.

Downfall
On 7 April 2022, he has been placed under investigation for "serious violations of discipline and laws" by the Central Commission for Discipline Inspection (CCDI), the party's internal disciplinary body, and the National Supervisory Commission, the highest anti-corruption agency of China.

References

1961 births
Living people
People from Kunming
People's Republic of China politicians from Yunnan
Chinese Communist Party politicians from Yunnan